Arnold Shara (born 18 March 2000) is a Zimbabwean cricketer. He made his first-class debut on 30 March 2021, for Tuskers, in the 2020–21 Logan Cup.

References

External links
 

2000 births
Living people
Zimbabwean cricketers
Matabeleland Tuskers cricketers
Place of birth missing (living people)